A baogel is a hybrid between a bagel and a pork-filled cha siu bao bun, created as a joint collaboration of Black Seed Bagel and Nom Wah Kuai in New York City in November 2017. As a hybrid of two foods, it has been compared to the cronut by several commentators.

References 

Food and drink introduced in 2017
Bagels
Buns
Cuisine of New York City
American Chinese cuisine
Chinese-American culture in New York City